Harbhajan can refer to:
 Harbhajan Singh E.T.O. Punjabi politician from Jandiala
Harbhajan Mann, a Punjabi singer and actor
Harbhajan Rai, a former field hockey player from Canada
Baba Harbhajan Singh, an Indian army soldier who died near the Nathula Pass in eastern Sikkim, India
Harbhajan Lakha, Indian politician.
Harbhajan Singh (poet), a Punjabi poet, critic, cultural commentator, and translator
Harbhajan Singh, an Indian cricketer
Harbhajan Singh (basketball) (born 1951), Indian Olympic basketball player
Harbhajan Singh (mountaineer) Mountaineer
Harbhajan Singh Yogi, a master of Kundalini Yoga and spiritual leader for the 3HO movement

Indian given names